Pavel Kotov was the defending champion but chose not to participate.

Luca Nardi won the title after defeating Mukund Sasikumar 6–3, 6–1 in the final.

Seeds

Draw

Finals

Top half

Bottom half

References

External links
Main draw
Qualifying draw

Città di Forlì - 1